Naomi S. Geraghty (born May 1969 in Dublin) is an Irish film editor. She is married to editor Joe Landauer.

Filmography 
 1995: Dealers Among Dealers
 1996: Some Mother's Son
 1997: Cop Land
 1998: Return to Paradise
 1998: Practical Magic
 1999: A Map of the World
 2000: Blue Moon
 2000-2001: The District (9 episodes)
 2002: In America
 2004: Hotel Rwanda
 2006: The Illusionist
 2007: The Lucky Ones
 2007: Reservation Road
 2011: Limitless
 2016: Pelé: Birth of a Legend
 2017: The Upside
 2021: Voyagers
 TBA: The Marsh King's Daughter

References

External links 
 

Living people
1969 births
Irish film editors
Irish women editors
Film people from Dublin (city)